The 2020 chess calendar was disrupted by the COVID-19 pandemic, but major events that took place included the Tata Steel Chess Tournament, won by Fabiano Caruana, and Norway Chess, won by Magnus Carlsen. The Candidates began in March, but, due to the pandemic, was postponed at the half-way stage with Ian Nepomniachtchi and Maxime Vachier-Lagrave leading.

2020 tournaments 
This is a list of significant 2020 chess tournaments:

Supertournaments

Open events

Deaths
 28 February — Gennady Kuzmin
 5 March — Stanislav Bogdanovich
 20 April — Arsen Yegiazarian
 22 August — Miron Sher
 24 August — Wolfgang Uhlmann
 4 September — Dmitry Svetushkin
 1 November — Markus Stangl
 17 December — Krzysztof Bulski

References

 
21st century in chess
Chess by year
2020 sport-related lists